Pelagia Papamichail (born April 29, 1986, in Thessaloniki, Greece) is a Greek female basketball player. She plays for Olympiacos.

References

External links
Profile at fiba.com

1986 births
Living people
Olympiacos Women's Basketball players
Basketball players from Thessaloniki
Greek women's basketball players
Centers (basketball)
ŽKK Gospić players